Yun Hee-keong(Korean:윤희경)(born ) is a South Korean wheelchair curler.

She participated at the 2014 where South Korean team finished on ninth place.

Life
Yun was born with a physical disability. Yun decided to enter the world of curling in 2008 and was scouted in the Uijeongbu disability curling team "Rollingstones" in 2011. She was selected to represent the national wheelchair curling team in 2021 as part of the team kyeonggido runbacks.

Wheelchair curling teams and events

References

External links 

Profile at the 2014 Winter Paralympics site

Living people
1967 births
South Korean female curlers
South Korean wheelchair curlers
Paralympic wheelchair curlers of South Korea
Wheelchair curlers at the 2014 Winter Paralympics
Place of birth missing (living people)